Love You till Tuesday is a compilation of 1960s material by David Bowie, issued as a companion to the belated video release of Bowie's 1969 promotional film Love You till Tuesday.

Deram, Bowie's record label from 1966 to mid-1969, released the soundtrack to the film. Due to its release when Bowie was a star, this has often been confused with his debut album. It does share some songs with the 1967 LP, but most of it was remixed in 1984. It was the first release to feature the original version of "Space Oddity", "Ching-a-Ling" and "When I'm Five", and also included previously unreleased versions of "Sell Me a Coat" and "When I Live My Dream".

In 1992, Pickwick Records reissued the compilation on CD, featuring a modified track list and a different cover. In addition to re-ordering the tracks, it also featured different versions of "Space Oddity", "Ching-a-Ling", "Love You till Tuesday", "Rubber Band" and "When I Live My Dream". The first two are longer versions (the vinyl version had the shorter "film edit" version of "Space Oddity") while the last three were replaced by the versions from the 1967 album.

Track listing

Side 1 
 "Love You till Tuesday" (single version)  – 2:40
 "The London Boys"  – 3:18
 "Ching-a-ling"  – 2:02
 "The Laughing Gnome"  – 3:03
 "Liza Jane"  – 2:14
 "When I'm Five"  – 2:07

Side 2 
 "Space Oddity"  – 3:45
 "Sell Me a Coat"  – 2:53
 "Rubber Band" (single version)  – 2:05
 "Let Me Sleep Beside You"  – 3:25
 "When I Live My Dream"  – 3:55

1992 CD 
 "Space Oddity"  – 4:35
 "Love You till Tuesday"  – 3:09
 "When I'm Five"  – 2:07
 "Ching-a-ling"  – 2:02
 "The Laughing Gnome"  – 3:03
 "Rubber Band"  – 2:17
 "Sell Me a Coat"  – 2:53
 "Liza Jane"  – 2:14
 "When I Live My Dream"  – 3:22
 "Let Me Sleep Beside You"  – 3:25
 "The London Boys"  – 3:18

Chart performance
In the United Kingdom, Love You till Tuesday peaked at #53 on the UK Albums Chart during 1984.

References

Works cited
 

1984 compilation albums
David Bowie compilation albums
Deram Records compilation albums
Pickwick Records soundtracks
Soundtracks by English artists